Buzz Foto is a photo agency based in Los Angeles, California, founded by photojournalists Brad Elterman and Henry Flores.

Buzz Foto is a producer and aggregator of editorial and creative photography, celebrity news and celebrity video footage. Buzz Foto has an online archive, a Media Grid based on Adobe Flash, of approximately one million images and digital assets.

Buzz Foto serves a large base of newspapers, magazines, web portals, television stations, book publishers, and e-media clients around the world.

Buzz Foto held the first modern day paparazzi exhibition at the Seyhoun Gallery in Beverly Hills, California, USA.

History
Buzz Foto was founded in 2006 by Brad Elterman and Henry Flores. In 2007, they debuted their brand "Paparazzi As An Art Form!" in a televised interview on Extra

Following that, ABC News did its first presentation on Buzz Foto.  ABC presented the owners teaching a Parsons student, Justin Campbell.  Campbell was ready for his first paparazzi experience on Stephen Colbert as Colbert made his way to his car after giving a presentation at a New York City Apple Inc. Store.

In 2008, Buzz Foto was exhibited at the Seyhoun Gallery, owned by Maryam Seyhoun in West Hollywood, California, for its first paparazzi exhibition.  Seyhoun jumped at the idea of featuring this type of art, because in her words, "It is art!"

Christine N. Ziemba, a correspondent for the Los Angeles Times, argued that "Paparazzi As An Art Form" may not fly, ending the article with "Don't laugh too hard.  Andy Warhol's 'Gold Marilyn Monroe' now hangs at the Museum of Modern Art."

The First Modern Day Paparazzi Exhibition ran from February 16–21, 2008, during which ABC News did another interview with Elterman and Flores.

Bibliography
 Shoot The Stars - How To Become a Celebrity Photographer (July 1985 California Features International, Inc.)   
 A Day In The Life Of The Paparazzi! – Hard Cover with Dust Jacket (August 2010 Blurb, Inc.)   
 A Day In The Life Of The Paparazzi! – Soft Cover (August 2010 Blurb, Inc.)   
 Like It Was Yesterday (July 2009 Seventy Seven Press, LLC) 
 Like It Was Yesterday - Standard Landscape - Soft Cover and Hard Cover With Dust Jacket (July 2009 Blurb, Inc.)  
 Like It Was Yesterday - Large Format Landscape - Hard Cover With Dust Jacket (July 2009 Blurb, Inc.)

References

External links
BuzzFoto.com (Official site)
 BuzzFoto's Official Media Grid (Official Site)

Companies based in Los Angeles
Mass media companies established in 2006
2006 establishments in California
Photo agencies